Jens Henrik Winther Thulesen Dahl (born 20 July 1961 in Brædstrup) is a Danish politician, who is a member of the Folketing for the Denmark Democrats, and former member of the Danish People's Party. He was elected into parliament at the 2011 Danish general election.

Background
Jens Henrik Thulesen Dahl is the brother of fellow MF Kristian Thulesen Dahl.

Political career
Thulesen Dahl has been a member of the municipal council of Assens Municipality since 2010.

Thulesen Dahl first ran for parliament in the 2011 general election, where he was elected with 5,594 votes. He was reelected with 9,923	votes in the 2015 election and again in the 2019 election with 2,913 votes. He joined the newly-founded party the Denmark Democrats in August 2022, and was re-elected at the 2022 Danish general election with 2,210 votes.

References

External links 
 Biography on the website of the Danish Parliament (Folketinget)

Living people
1961 births
People from Horsens Municipality
Danish People's Party politicians
Danish municipal councillors
Members of the Folketing 2011–2015
Members of the Folketing 2015–2019
Members of the Folketing 2019–2022
Members of the Folketing 2022–2026
Denmark Democrats politicians